Steven Myers (born 8 December 1972) is a Canadian politician, who was elected to the Legislative Assembly of Prince Edward Island in the 2011 provincial election. He represents the district of Georgetown-Pownal as a member of the Progressive Conservative Party of Prince Edward Island and was Leader of the Opposition in the legislature, from 2013 to 2015.

He was chosen interim leader of the PEI Progressive Conservative Party on January 31, 2013, following party leader Olive Crane's resignation, and became Opposition leader on February 11, 2013, when Hal Perry relinquished the role.

Myers' tenure as PC interim leader came to an end on February 28, 2015, upon the election of Rob Lantz as leader.

Lantz, who failed to win a seat in the legislature in the 2015 provincial election requested that Myers remain as opposition leader; Myers accepted.

Myers was replaced as opposition leader on October 15, 2015, by newly named PC interim leader Jamie Fox.

On May 9, 2019, Myers was appointed to the Executive Council of Prince Edward Island as Minister of Transportation, Infrastructure and Energy.

Electoral record

References

External links
 Steven Myers

Living people
People from Kings County, Prince Edward Island
Progressive Conservative Party of Prince Edward Island leaders
Progressive Conservative Party of Prince Edward Island MLAs
Members of the Executive Council of Prince Edward Island
21st-century Canadian politicians
1972 births